Antropovsky (masculine), Antropovskaya (feminine), or Antropovskoye (neuter) is the name of several rural localities in Russia:
Antropovskoye, a village in Ivnyakovsky Rural Okrug of Yaroslavsky District of Yaroslavl Oblast
Antropovskaya, Plesetsky District, Arkhangelsk Oblast, a village in Fedovsky Selsoviet of Plesetsky District of Arkhangelsk Oblast
Antropovskaya, Shenkursky District, Arkhangelsk Oblast, a village in Shegovarsky Selsoviet of Shenkursky District of Arkhangelsk Oblast